The Like Minded-Group of Developing Countries (LMDC) is a group of developing countries who organise themselves as a block negotiators in international organizations such as the United Nations and the World Trade Organization, they represent more than 50% of the world's
population.

According to a statement by the Chinese diplomat Sha Zukang in 2005, the member countries of the Like Minded Group are Algeria, Bangladesh, Belarus, Bhutan, China, Cuba, Egypt, India, Indonesia, Iran, Malaysia, Myanmar, Nepal, Pakistan, the Philippines, Sri Lanka, Sudan, Syria, Vietnam, and Zimbabwe.

However, following the LMDC countries who negotiate in the United Nations Framework Convention on Climate Change fora, the members are Algeria, Bangladesh, Bolivia, China, Cuba, Ecuador, Egypt, El Salvador, India, Indonesia, Iran, Iraq, Jordan, Kuwait, Malaysia, Mali, Nicaragua, Pakistan, Saudi Arabia, Sri Lanka, Sudan, Syria, Venezuela and Vietnam.

Members

References

External links 
 Written submission on Elements of the 2015 Agreed Outcome of the United Nations Framework Convention on Climate Change (UNFCCC)
 LMDC Opening Plenary Statement in the ADP 2.1 of the UNFCCC
 Written statement submitted by South Asian Human Rights Documentation Centre 
 Written statement submitted by South Asian Human Rights Documentation Centre 
 Statement by H.E. Ambassador SHA Zukang, on behalf of the Like Minded Group, at the Meeting between the President of the General Assembly and the Commission on Human Rights 
 India hosts meeting of LMDC countries

Intergovernmental organizations
United Nations coalitions and unofficial groups